Czarni, means "The Blacks" in the Polish language, and is a name commonly given to Polish sports teams, including:

Czarni Dęblin, men's association football club
Czarni Jasło, men's association football club
Czarni Lwów, men's association football club
Czarni Olecko, men's association football club
Czarni Pruszcz Gdański, association football and rugby union club
Czarni Radom, men's volleyball club
Czarni Słupsk, men's basketball club
Czarni Sosnowiec, men's association football club
Czarni Wierzchosławice, men's association football club
Czarni Żagań, men's association football club

See also
Czarna (disambiguation)